The following radio stations broadcast on AM frequency 770 kHz: 770 AM is a United States clear-channel frequency.  WABC New York City and KCHU Valdez, Alaska, share Class A status on 770 kHz.

In Argentina 
 Cooperativa in Buenos Aires

In Canada 
 CHQR in Calgary, Alberta - 50 kW, transmitter located at

In Colombia 
 HJJX in Bogotá, Distrito Capital

In Mexico 
 XEACH-AM in Guadalupe, Nuevo León
 XEANT-AM in Tancanhuitz de Santos, San Luis Potosí
 XEFRTM-AM in Fresnillo, Zacatecas

In the United States 
Stations in bold are clear-channel stations.

In Uruguay 
 CX 12 Radio Oriental in Montevideo

External links

 FCC list of radio stations on 770 kHz

References

Lists of radio stations by frequency